As of July 2016, the International Union for Conservation of Nature (IUCN) listed 987 critically endangered invertebrate species, including 206 which are tagged as possibly extinct. Of all evaluated invertebrate species, 5.5% are listed as critically endangered. 
The IUCN also lists 14 invertebrate subspecies as critically endangered.

No subpopulations of invertebrates have been evaluated by the IUCN.

Additionally 5278 invertebrate species (29% of those evaluated) are listed as data deficient, meaning there is insufficient information for a full assessment of conservation status. As these species typically have small distributions and/or populations, they are intrinsically likely to be threatened, according to the IUCN. While the category data deficient indicates that no assessment of extinction risk has been made for the taxa, the IUCN notes that it may be appropriate to give them "the same degree of attention as threatened taxa, at least until their status can be assessed".

This is a complete list of critically endangered invertebrate species and subspecies as evaluated by the IUCN. Species considered possibly extinct by the IUCN are marked as such.

Nemertea species
Prosadenoporus agricola (possibly extinct)

Annelids
Mesonerilla prospera

Onychophora

Molluscs

There are 581 mollusc species and 11 mollusc subspecies assessed as critically endangered.

Gastropods
There are 511 gastropod species and six gastropod subspecies assessed as critically endangered.

Stylommatophora
Stylommatophora includes the majority of land snails and slugs. There are 233 species and five subspecies in the order Stylommatophora assessed as critically endangered.

Amastrids

Partulids

Achatinellids

Endodontids

Species

Subspecies

Charopids

Helicarionids

Orthalicids
{{columns-list|colwidth=30em|*Bulimulus achatellinus (possibly extinct)
Bulimulus adelphus (possibly extinct)
Bulimulus adserseni
Bulimulus chemitzioides
Bulimulus curtus
Bulimulus deridderi (possibly extinct)
Bulimulus duncanus (possibly extinct)
Bulimulus eos (possibly extinct)
Bulimulus eschariferus
Bulimulus galapaganus
Bulimulus habeli
Bulimulus hirsutus
Bulimulus indefatigabilis
Bulimulus jacobi
Bulimulus lycodus (possibly extinct)
Bulimulus ochsneri
Bulimulus reibischi
Bulimulus saeronius (possibly extinct)
Bulimulus sculpturatus
Bulimulus sp. nov. 'josevillani' (possibly extinct)
Bulimulus sp. nov. 'krameri' (possibly extinct)
Bulimulus sp. nov. 'nilsodhneri' (possibly extinct)
Bulimulus sp. nov. 'tuideroyi' (possibly extinct)
Bulimulus sp. nov. 'vanmoli' (possibly extinct)
Bulimulus tanneri (possibly extinct)Bulimulus wolfiLeuchocharis pancheriLord Howe flax snail (Placostylus bivaricosus)Placostylus koroensis (possibly extinct)Placostylus mbengensis}}

Rhytidids

Streptaxids

Lauriids

Helicids

Hygromiids

Enids

Other Stylommatophora species

Littorinimorpha
There are 181 species in the order Littorinimorpha assessed as critically endangered.
Hydrobiids

Cochliopids

Bithyniids

MoitessieriidsHenrigirardia wienini (possibly extinct)Spiralix corsica (possibly extinct)

Assimineids

Pomatiopsids

Sorbeoconcha

Architaenioglossa
There are 48 species in the order Architaenioglossa assessed as critically endangered.
Cyclophorids

Diplommatinids

Viviparids

Other Architaenioglossa species

Cycloneritimorpha

Hygrophila

Species

SubspeciesBulinus tropicus torensisNeogastropoda

Other gastropod species

Bivalvia
There are 69 species and five subspecies in the class Bivalvia assessed as critically endangered.
Unionida
There are 66 species and five subspecies in the order Unionoida assessed as critically endangered.
Margaritiferids

Species

SubspeciesMargaritifera margaritifera durrovensisEtheriidsAcostaea rivoliiUnionids

Species

Subspecies

Hyriids
Glenelg freshwater mussel (Hyridella glenelgensis)

Venerida

CephalopodsOpisthoteuthis chathamensisCnidaria

Arthropods

There are 394 arthropod species and three arthropod subspecies assessed as critically endangered.
Centipedes

Seed shrimpsKapcypridopsis barnardiSpelaeoecia bermudensisArachnids
There are 47 arachnid species assessed as critically endangered.
Harvestmen

Spiders

Other arachnid species

Branchiopoda

Millipedes

Entognatha
Ceratophysella sp. nov. 'HC' (possibly extinct)Delamarephorura tami (possibly extinct)

Maxillopoda

Malacostracans
Malacostraca includes crabs, lobsters, crayfish, shrimp, krill, woodlice, and many others. There are 125 malacostracan species and one malacostracan subspecies assessed as critically endangered.
MysidaBermudamysis speluncolaSterrer's cave mysid (Platyops sterreri)

MictaceansMictocaris halopeIsopods

Amphipods

Decapods
There are 106 decapod species and one decapod subspecies assessed as critically endangered.
Parastacids

Gecarcinucids

Atyids

Cambarids

Species

SubspeciesProcambarus rogersi expletusPalaemonids

Other decapod species

Insects

There are 195 insect species and two insect subspecies assessed as critically endangered.
Blattodea

Orthoptera
There are 72 species in the order Orthoptera assessed as critically endangered.
Euschmidtiids

Crickets

Acridids

Tettigoniids

Other Orthoptera species

Hymenoptera

Lepidoptera

Beetles

Odonata

Species

SubspeciesChlorogomphus brunneus keramensisDelphi cordulegaster (Cordulegaster helladica kastalia'')

Other insect species

See also 
 Lists of IUCN Red List critically endangered species
 List of least concern invertebrates
 List of near threatened invertebrates
 List of vulnerable invertebrates
 List of endangered invertebrates
 List of recently extinct invertebrates
 List of data deficient invertebrates

References 

Invertebrates
Critically endangered invertebrates